.
Its most numerous fish are Sattar snowtrout and False osman. The lake forms part of the Djavshangoz Important Bird Area.

References

Lakes of Tajikistan
Important Bird Areas of Tajikistan
Gorno-Badakhshan Autonomous Region